Jiangsu Expressway Company Limited is a road constructions and operations enterprise incorporated in the People's Republic of China. It is engaged in the investment, construction, operation and management of toll expressways in Jiangsu Province, China. The expressways include Shanghai-Nanjing Expressway, Shanghai-Nanjing section of China National Highway 312, Xicheng Expressway, Guangjing Expressway, Nanjing section of Nanjing-Lianyungang Expressway, Jiangsu section of the Sujiahang Expressway and Jiangyin Yangtze River Bridge.

References

External links
Jiangsu Expressway Company Limited

Companies listed on the Hong Kong Stock Exchange
Companies listed on the Shanghai Stock Exchange
Chinese companies established in 1992
Government-owned companies of China
Construction and civil engineering companies of China
Companies based in Nanjing
H shares
Construction and civil engineering companies established in 1992